Marcelo Demoliner and João Souza were the defending champions but chose not to defend their title.

Marcelo Arévalo and Miguel Ángel Reyes-Varela won the title after defeating Nicolás Jarry and Roberto Quiroz 4–6, 6–4, [10–7] in the final.

Seeds

Draw

References
 Main Draw

Quito Challenger - Doubles
2017 Doubles